The Philippine twenty-peso coin (₱20) is the largest denomination coin of the Philippine peso.

History
New Generation Currency Series: In July 2019, the Bangko Sentral ng Pilipinas (BSP) announced that the 20 peso note will be replaced with a coin due to the overuse of the banknote, since each individual note only lasts about a year in circulation while a 20 peso coin lasts for 10 to 15 years. The decision is based on research by the University of the Philippines. In September 2019, the ₱20 coin was finally designed, with BSP Governor Benjamin Diokno stating that the design would retain Manuel L. Quezon as the person on the obverse, that the coin would be bi-metallic  with a bronze-plated steel outer ring and a nickel-plated steel center and that it will be slightly bigger than the P10 coin. He also mentioned there would be other features making it distinct from the other New Generation coins. Photos of the new coin were released on 17 December 2019, along with the "enhanced" 5 peso coin, confirming their designs. The coin was initially planned to be released in late 2019 or early 2020, and in another 17 December report, it was reported that 500,000 coins of the new denomination were released, with more to be minted in 2020.

Version history

References

Currencies of the Philippines
Coins of the Philippines
Twenty-base-unit coins